Robert Corbett (16 March 1922 – October 1988) was an English footballer who played as a defender. He was the brother of George Corbett, also a professional footballer. He began playing at non-league club Throckley Welfare, later moving to Newcastle United and made his professional debut in 1946 against Barnsley F.C. after the conclusion of the Second World War. He was sold to neighbouring club Middlesbrough in 1951 for £9000, where he made 92 appearances over five seasons. He finished his career with a two-year spell at Northampton Town.

Corbett won an FA Cup winners medal with Newcastle in the 1951 FA Cup Final after defeating Blackpool 2–0. He played alongside other notable players such as Jackie Milburn and Charlie Crowe.

Corbett died in October 1988 at the age of 66 after spending his retirement living in North Walbottle.

Honours

As a player
Newcastle United
 FA Cup winner: 1951

References

External links
 FA Cup Finals

1922 births
1988 deaths
English footballers
English Football League players
Association football fullbacks
Middlesbrough F.C. players
Newcastle United F.C. players
Northampton Town F.C. players
People from Throckley
Footballers from Tyne and Wear
FA Cup Final players